The Health Research and Development Information Network PLUS (HERDIN PLUS) is a research information management system and collaboration platform for Higher Education and Research and Development Institutions to collect, organize, and disseminate research information at the institutional level, making it easier to generate reports for CHED, DOST, DOH and other bodies. It can be accessed at http://herdin.ph. 

HERDIN PLUS is the new branding of the Philippine Health Research Registry and a one stop (health) research information management platform in the Philippines.

Benefits of using HERDIN PLUS

1.Enhanced access to and sharing of research information 

Disseminate research outputs to wider audience for free. 

2.Simplified and streamlined research information management 

Centralize your institutional ongoing or completed research information files in one system. 
 
3.Track your institutional performance or progress as a researcher  

Researchers and research institutions can use the system to build their research credentials and gauge their institutional performance. 

4.Reduce institutional reporting burden 

Contains standardized reporting fields and will only need to be submitted once by research offices. 

5.Quick and customizable reporting  

Allows institutions, researchers to customize report based on PNHRS indicators and institutional inputs. 

6.Free 

Open to all institutions without an existing research information system.

History
It started during the 1980s as a project of the Philippine Council for Health Research and Development (PCHRD) supported by the International Development Research Centre (IDRC) of Canada, United Nations Educational, Scientific and Cultural Organization (UNESCO), and the British Council with the Department of Health and University of the Philippines Manila as major cooperators.

1987 - Establish systems, procedures, & databases
1991 - HERDIN Online (Bulletin Board System, Dial-up)
1994 - HERDIN Online (Internet)
1997 - HERDIN CD version 1
1998 - Introduction and use of eHealth ph communities
2002 - Opensource Systems
2003 - ISIS Online (open isis), Annual CD version release
2005 - Ganesha Digital Library
2007 - Network-of-Networks (NeoN)
2012 - The Philippine Health Research Registry was launched with DOH-FDA for registering clinical trials as  well as newly-approved and ongoing health researches.
2015 - The PNHRS (PNHRS) Monitoring and Evaluation module was developed for online data collection and report generation. 
2017 - The Project Management System was developed as a tool for online submission, review and approval of proposals and monitoring of approved projects. 
2019 - We integrated the four systems into one, now called HERDIN PLUS.

References

International Development Research Centre - Health Research and Development Information Network (HERDIN) (Philippines)
Council on Health Research for Development (COHRED) – The Global Health Research Agenda: A Case Study Approach – Appendix 6: Case Study: Philippines

External links
Health Research and Development Information Network (HERDIN PLUS)
Philippine Council for Health Research and Development website

Healthcare in the Philippines